Argyresthia albistria is a moth of the family Yponomeutidae. It is found in most of Europe.

The wingspan is 9–12 mm. The head is white. Forewings are ferruginous-brown, purplish-tinged; a white dorsal streak to tornus, interrupted by a dark ferruginous -brown quadrate median spot. Hindwings are grey. The larva is pale green; a red band on each segment; head and plate of 2 black.

The moth flies at night from June to August and is attracted to light.

The larvae feed on blackthorn (Prunus spinosa), overwintering and feeding in the spring.

References

External links
 Lepidoptera of Belgium
 Argyresthia albistria at UKmoths

Moths described in 1828
Argyresthia
Moths of Europe